The 1942 Football League War Cup Final was contested by Wolverhampton Wanderers and Sunderland. For the only time in the competition's history, the trophy was decided over a two-leg final, played on 23 May and 30 May 1942. Wolverhampton Wanderers won the tie 6–3 on aggregate.

One week after winning the Cup, Northern winners Wolves played the 1942 London Cup winners Brentford in a North v South charity decider at Stamford Bridge - the first of four consecutive years that such a club championship game was played on Chelsea's ground between the winners of the London Cup (from 1943 to 1945 renamed the Football League (South) War Cup) which was played as a single game at Wembley, and the two-legged winners of the Football League (North) War Cup. Wolves and Brentford drew the 1942 match 1-1 on 6 June in front of a crowd of 20,174. No replays were played when these North v South end of season 'deciders' at Chelsea ended in draws.

Match details

First leg

Second leg

References

League War Cup Final, 1942
Football League War Cup
War Cup Final 1942
War Cup Final 1942